Joseph Schröffer (February 20, 1903 – September 7, 1983) was a German Cardinal of the Roman Catholic Church. He served as Secretary of the Sacred Congregation of Seminaries and Universities from 1967 to 1976, and was elevated to the cardinalate in 1976.

Biography
Born in Ingolstadt, Joseph Schröffer studied at the seminary in Eichstätt and the Pontifical Gregorian University in Rome before being ordained to the priesthood on October 28, 1928. He then furthered his studies in Rome until 1931, when he undertook his pastoral ministry among German exiles until 1933. Before serving as vicar general of Eichstätt from 1941 to 1948, he taught at the Superior School of Philosophy and Theology there.

On July 23, 1948, Schröffer was appointed Bishop of Eichstätt by Pope Pius XII. He received his episcopal consecration on the following September 21 from Archbishop Joseph Otto Kolb, with Bishops Joseph Wendel and Arthur Landgraf serving as co-consecrators. Schröffer attended the Second Vatican Council from 1962 to 1965, and entered the Roman Curia upon being named Secretary of the Sacred Congregation of Seminaries and Universities on May 17, 1967. As Secretary, he was the second-highest official of that dicastery, successively under Cardinals Giuseppe Pizzardo and Gabriel-Marie Garrone. Schröffer was later advanced to Titular Archbishop of Volturnum on January 2, 1968. In 1973, following the release of the Congregation for the Doctrine of the Faith's document Mysterium Ecclesia, the Archbishop attacked the liberal theologian Hans Küng for his opposition to papal infallibility.

Pope Paul VI created him Cardinal Deacon of S. Saba in the consistory of May 24, 1976. On that same date, Schröffer resigned as Secretary of Seminaries and Universities, after nine years of service. He was one of the cardinal electors who participated in the conclaves of August and October 1978, which selected Popes John Paul I and John Paul II respectively. The Cardinal served as a special papal representative to the jubilee celebration of the Cologne Cathedral on August 15, 1980.

Schröffer died in Nuremberg at age 80, and is buried in Eichstätt Cathedral.

References

External links
Cardinals of the Holy Roman Church
Catholic-Hierarchy

1903 births
1983 deaths
20th-century German cardinals
Knights Commander of the Order of Merit of the Federal Republic of Germany
Participants in the Second Vatican Council
Members of the Congregation for Catholic Education
Cardinals created by Pope Paul VI
Roman Catholic bishops of Eichstätt